Statistics of L. League in the 1994 season. Matsushita Electric LSC Bambina won the championship.

First stage

Second stage

Championship playoff 
 Yomiuri-Seiyu Beleza 0-1 Matsushita Electric LSC Bambina
Matsushita Electric LSC Bambina won the championship.

League standings

League awards

Best player

Top scorers

Best eleven

Best young player

JLSL Challenge League

Promotion/relegation series

Division 1 promotion/relegation series 

 Tasaki Perule FC Promoted for Division 1 in 1995 Season.
 Urawa Ladies FC Relegated to Division 2 in 1995 Season.

See also 
 Empress's Cup

External links 
  Nadeshiko League Official Site

Nadeshiko League seasons
L
Japan
Japan
1994 in Japanese women's sport